Maurice Amollo Ouma (first name also spelt Morris) (born 8 November 1982) is a Kenyan cricketer and a former limited over captain. He is a right-handed batsman and also plays as a wicket-keeper. He has played for the Kenyan cricket team since 2000.

International career
Ouma represented Kenya in the Under-19 World Cups of both 2000 and 2002, while maintaining his position at the top of the middle-order. He made his next step up at the ICC Six Nations Challenge, in which Kenya came out victorious in the final in Windhoek. He then played in the 2003 edition of the Sharjah Cup. Around this period, he was described by Hossain Ayob, the African development manager for the ICC, as a star in the making. Ouma was on the losing Kenyan side in the 2005 ICC Intercontinental Cup final, who stumbled in the second innings despite first-innings centuries from Steve Tikolo and Hitesh Modi.

Most recently, Ouma participated in a three-game ODI series against Bangladesh in August 2006. Ouma has progressively made his way up from being a lower-middle order batsman to an opening batsman, particularly strong against smaller nations such as the young Bangladesh squad.

References
 https://www.cricketwa.com/10797/player/morris-amollo-ouma.aspx

External links
 

1982 births
Living people
Kenyan cricketers
Kenya One Day International cricketers
Kenya Twenty20 International cricketers
Western Chiefs cricketers
Cricketers at the 2007 Cricket World Cup
Cricketers at the 2011 Cricket World Cup
Kenyan cricket captains
Wicket-keepers